Sedeh Rural District is a rural district (dehestan) in Sedeh District, Eqlid County, Fars Province, Iran. At the 2006 census, its population was 381, in 80 families.  The rural district has three villages.

References 

Rural Districts of Fars Province
Eqlid County